Ost und West ("East and West") was a German magazine meant to bridge the German Jewish world and the Eastern European Jewish world. The magazine, headquartered in Berlin, operated from 1901 to 1923.

History
It was the first "ethnic magazine" in human history and the first Jewish illustrierte (DE). The editors intended to reverse assimilation of Jewish people into the wider German society and David Brenner, author of "Neglected 'Women's' Texts and Contexts: Vicki Baum's Jewish Ghetto Stories," stated that the editors hoped to accomplish this "by constructing an ethnic identity that included East European or "Eastern" forms of Jewishness."

David A. Brenner, author of German-Jewish Popular Culture before the Holocaust: Kafka's kitsch, wrote that the magazine is an "ideal" source for evaluating the reception to Yiddish theatre in Germany especially since "studies of popular Berlin theater, including Yiddish-language theater, are few and far between".

References

Further reading
 Brenner, David A. Marketing Identities: The Invention of Jewish Ethnicity in Ost und West. Wayne State University Press, 1998. , 9780814326848.
 Digitized files for Ost and West can be found at the Judaica Division Goethe University /University Library, Frankfurt am Main, Germany Vollständig digitalisierte Zeitschrift in Compact Memory

 Brenner, David A. "Neglected 'Women's' Texts and Contexts: Vicki Baum's Jewish Ghetto Stories." In: Friedrichsmeyer, Sara and Patricia Herminghouse (editors). Women in German Yearbook. University of Nebraska Press, June 1, 1998. , 9780803298033.
 Brenner, David A. German-Jewish Popular Culture before the Holocaust: Kafka's kitsch. Taylor & Francis US, July 8, 2008. , 9780203894033.

1901 establishments in Germany
1923 disestablishments in Germany
Cultural magazines published in Germany
German-language magazines
Jewish magazines
Magazines established in 1901
Magazines disestablished in 1923
Magazines published in Berlin